Asupini Ella, also sometimes referred to as Ahupini Ella (is a waterfall which is located at Ganga Ihala Koralaya, Rakshawa in Aranayaka, Kegalle of Sabaragamuwa Province. The waterfall was named after a popular ancient fairytale story. It forms part of Maha Oya and it is considered as one of the tourist destination sites in Sri Lanka.

History 
The waterfall was named after the story relating to the story of a king who had many queens, according to the ancient myth and tales. On his return from war, he assured them that he would give all his wives, a sign from the hills about the fate of the war. He said that if his soldiers waved a white flag over the hills, it would mean he was defeated and killed in action and further said that if he waved his own flag bearing his crest, that he was victorious. The king played a foul play on his wives, who were keenly waiting with their horses near the waterfall to see the visual message by waving a white flag. All of his wives committed suicide by jumping over the falls.

Etymology 
Asupini is derived from 'Aswaya' (Horse) and 'Pini' or 'Panina' (Jump) which combined means "the horses jumped over the falls".

See also 

 List of waterfalls of Sri Lanka

References 

Waterfalls of Sri Lanka
Landforms of Kegalle District